Uwe Heppner (born 18 July 1960) is a retired German rower. He competed for East Germany at the 1980 and 1988 Summer Olympics and won a gold medal in the quadruple sculls in 1980. He finished fifth in the double sculls in 1988. Between 1979 and 1987 he won four gold and three bronze medals in these two events at the world championships and finished fourth in 1989. In October 1986, he was awarded a Patriotic Order of Merit in gold (first class) for his sporting success.

References

1960 births
Living people
People from Merseburg
People from Bezirk Halle
East German male rowers
Sportspeople from Saxony-Anhalt
Olympic rowers of East Germany
Rowers at the 1980 Summer Olympics
Rowers at the 1988 Summer Olympics
Olympic gold medalists for East Germany
Olympic medalists in rowing
World Rowing Championships medalists for East Germany
Medalists at the 1980 Summer Olympics
Recipients of the Patriotic Order of Merit in gold